German actress and recording artist Jeanette Biedermann began her professional music career in 1998. Her discography, as a solo artist, includes sixth regular studio albums, a holiday album, twenty-one singles and four DVD albums, which she released on Universal Music and her former label Polydor Records.

Biedermann began her music career in 1999 with the German-language single "Das tut unheimlich weh" following her win at the Bild-Schlagerwettbewerb competition in 1998. The song served as her official entry at the German pre-selection show for the Eurovision Song Contest 1999, where it ended fourth. However, the single failed to chart or sell noticeably afterwards. In 2001, she released her first full English-language album Enjoy!, which contained influences of europop and dance-pop music. While the album itself became a moderate commercial success, it spawned her top ten single "Go Back," which was certified gold in Germany. The following year, Biedermann's second album Delicious was released. It entered the top 20 of the charts and received a gold certification by the IFPI. Leading single "How It's Go to Be," which featured prominent portions of Tchaikovsky's ballet Swan Lake, became her second top ten entry and another gold-seller. Other singles released from the album include "No More Tears" and "Sunny Day."

Biedermann's more pop rock-oriented third studio album, Rock My Life, which began a marked shift in the sound of her music, was released in 2002 and became her biggest success yet, with both the album and its same-titled leading single going gold in Germany. Altogether it produced four singles, including "It's Over Now", "Right Now" and a duet with Ronan Keating, "We've Got Tonight," a cover version of Bob Seger's 1978 hit. All singles managed to reach the top ten of the domestic charts. Rock My Life was eventually outperformed by her fourth effort Break on Through (2003), Biedermann's first album with Universal Music following her departure from Polydor Records the same year. It became her first album to debut within the top ten of the Austrian and Swiss Albums Chart and received a platinum certification by the IFPI the following year. Spawning a total of four singles, including top five hit "Rockin' on Heaven's Floor," the album was reissued with additional songs in 2004.

In 2005, Biedermann collaborated with Electronic Arts on her single "Run with Me," which was used as a promotional track for the computer game The Sims and won her another ECHO Award for Best Video – National. The song appeared as a bonus track on her fifth regular album, Naked Truth (2006), which took her work further into the rock genre and, although less successful commercially than her previous release, still reached the top 20 of the German Albums Chart. From all three singles that were released from the album, "Bad Girls Club" became the only top 20 entry. Following a longer hiatus, Biedermann returned to music with her sixth album Undress to the Beat, which incorporated aspects of electropop and synthpop, in 2009. While the album was met with mixed reviews and moderate sales, its same-titled lead single became the singer's first top ten hit in five years. In 2019, Biedermann released DNA, her first solo album in a decade. Her first record to be entirely recorded in German language, it reached the top ten of the German Albums Chart.

Albums

Studio albums

Singles

Album appearances

Videography

DVDs

Music videos

References

External links 

  Official website
 Official MySpace
 

Discographies of German artists